Alpine Learning Group is a state approved, private special education school in Paramus, New Jersey, United States. Established in 1988, the school serves students aged 3 to 21 with autism spectrum disorder, and it is known to be a prestigious educational and research facility utilizing applied behavior analysis (ABA) services.

Although private schools are often independently operated, Alpine is tuition-free.

History
Founded by some of the leading behavior analysts in the field and a group of parents in New Jersey, Alpine Learning Group was one of the first ABA-based schools for autism formed in the United States. It officially started in 1989 when four children were instructed by a professional faculty in "the basement of a local community house."

The executive director and co-founder Bridget Taylor, Psy.D., B.C.B.A.-D., as well as other supervising staff at the school wrote the curriculum in the popular training manual Behavioral intervention for young children with autism: A manual for parents and professionals (1996), which was edited by Catherine Maurice, Ph.D., a New York City parent advocate who hired Taylor to run her two children's early ABA home programs in 1987.

Program
The school offers several programs grounded in the principles of ABA. Its educational program includes a faculty of over 100 staff who instruct a total of 35 students in a small, 1 to 1 classroom ratio.

Their Center for Autism provides home-based, structured and naturalistic early intensive behavioral intervention programs, such as discrete trial training and incidental teaching, for speech delayed children from birth to aged 5, social skills groups where students are taught how to interact with their peers, and a clinic that administers diagnostic and screening services.

The Ely Center for Adult Learning consists of transition programs, which train students between the ages of 16 and 21 to gain employment skills, as well as to prepare them for college or other pre-vocational career goals.

References

1988 establishments in New Jersey
1989 establishments in New Jersey
Autism-related organizations in the United States
Educational institutions established in 1988
Educational institutions established in 1989
Private schools in New Jersey
Schools for people on the autistic spectrum
Special schools in the United States